Oksana or Oxana, sometimes transliterated as  Aksana, is a female given name of Ukrainian origin. The closest equivalent is the Russian name Kseniya, but the two names coexist in use in both countries and neither of them is a shortening of the other.

Origin
The names Oksana, Xana, Sana and Kseniya are thought to originate from one of two Greek words: Xenia (hospitality) or Xenos (stranger). Axana is another alternative spelling.

People

Oksana 
 Oksana Akinshina (born 1987), Russian actress
 Oksana Wilhelmsson  (born 1984 as Oksana Andersson), Soviet Union-born member of Swedish band Sunblock
 Oksana Andrusina-Mert (born 1973), Turkish discus thrower of Russian origin
 Oksana Baiul (born 1977), Ukrainian Olympic and world champion figure skater
 Oksana Bilozir (born 1957), Ukrainian singer and stateswoman
 Oksana Chusovitina (born 1975), Uzbek gymnast
 Oksana Domnina (born 1984), Russian ice dancer
 Oksana Dyka (born 1978), Ukrainian opera soprano
 Oksana Esipchuk (born 1976), Russian discus thrower
 Oksana Fadeyeva (née Kushch) (born 1975), Russian table tennis player
 Oksana Fedorova or Oxana Fedorova (born 1977), Russian television presenter and Miss Universe 2002
 Oksana Gozeva (born 1989), Russian figure skater
 Oksana Grigorieva (born 1970), Russian musician
 Oksana Grishina (born 1968), Russian Olympic track cyclist
 Oksana Grishina (born 1978), Russian former gymnast and current professional fitness competitor
 Oksana Grishuk (born 1972), Russian figure skater
 Oksana Hatamkhanova (born 1990), Olympic swimmer from Azerbaijan
 Oksana Ilyushkina née Kochetkova (born 1974), retired Ukrainian athlete
 Oksana Ivanenko (1906–1997), Ukrainian children's writer and translator
 Oksana Kalashnikova (born 1990), Georgian professional tennis player
 Oksana Kazakova (born 1975), Russian figure skater
 Oksana Khvostenko (born 1977), Ukrainian biathlete
 Oksana Klimova (born 1992), Russian ice dancer
 Oksana Kondratyeva (born 1985), Russian hammer thrower
 Oksana Krechunyak (born 1981), paralympic athlete from Ukraine
 Oksana Kurt (or Parkhomenko, born 1984), Azerbaijani volleyball player
 Oksana Lada (born 1979), Ukrainian actress and model (also known as 'Oksana Babiy')
 Oksana Lyapina (born 1980), Russian gymnast
 Oksana Lyniv (born 1978), Ukrainian conductor
 Oksana Makar (1993–2012), Ukrainian murder victim
 Oksana Malaya or Oxana Malaya (born 1983), Ukrainian feral child
 Oksana Masters (born 1989), Ukrainian-born American Paralympic rower
 Oksana Okunyeva (born 1990), Ukrainian high jumper
 Oksana Omelianchik (born 1970), former Soviet gymnast
 Oksana Platero (born 1988), Russian ballroom dancer
 Oksana Pochepa (born 1984), Russian pop singer
 Oksana Potdykova (born 1979), former competitive Russian ice dancer
 Oksana Rogova, Russian triple jumper
 Oksana Shcherbak née Holodkova (born 1982), Ukrainian sprint athlete
 Oksana Shachko (1987 – 2018) Ukrainian artist and founder of feminist group FEMEN
 Oksana Serikova (born 1985), Ukrainian swimmer
 Oksana Shvets (1955–2022), Ukrainian actress
 Oksana Skaldina (born 1972), Ukrainian rhythmic gymnast
 Oksana Slivenko or Oxana Slivenko (born 1986), Russian weightlifter
 Oksana Udmurtova (born 1982), Russian athlete
 Oksana Vashchuk (born 1989), Ukrainian freestyle wrestler
 Oksana Voevodina (born 1992), Russian model, 2015 Miss Moscow winner and former wife of Muhammad V of Kelantan, Malaysia
 Oksana Yarygina (born 1972), Russian javelin thrower
 Oksana Yermakova (born 1973), Russian épée fencer
 Oksana Yeremeyeva (née Ryabinicheva, 1990), Russian football defender
 Oksana Zabuzhko (born 1960), Ukrainian writer and poet
 Oksana Zbrozhek (born 1978), Russian middle-distance runner
 Oksana Zubkovska, Ukrainian Paralympian athlete

Oxana 
 Oxana Fedorova or Oksana Fedorova (born 1977), Russian television presenter and Miss Universe 2002
 Oxana Malaya or Oksana Malaya (born 1983), Ukrainian feral child
 Oxana Slivenko or Oksana Slivenko (born 1986), Russian weightlifter

Aksana 
 Aksana (wrestler) (born 1982), a Lithuanian professional wrestler
 Aksana Drahun (born 1981), a Belarusian sprinter
 Aksana Dziamidava (born 1993), a Belarusian swimmer
 Aksana Kavalchuk (born 1979) is a Belarusian volleyball player
 Aksana Miankova (born 1982), a Belarusian hammer thrower
 Aksana Papko, (born 1988), a Belarusian track cyclist
 Aksana Sivitskaya, a Belarusian paralympic athlete

Fictional characters
 Oxana Vorontsova (in the 2018 novel Codename Villanelle) or Oksana Astankova (in the television series Killing Eve), birth name of fictional assassin Villanelle
 Oksa Pollock in the French children's fantasy series

See also

References

Russian feminine given names
Ukrainian feminine given names
Slavic feminine given names
Azerbaijani feminine given names